The 1946 Wisconsin gubernatorial election was held on November 5, 1946.

Incumbent Republican Governor Walter Samuel Goodland defeated Democratic nominee Daniel Hoan in a rematch of the 1944 election with 59.78% of the vote.

Primary elections
Primary elections were held on August 13, 1946.

Democratic primary

Candidates
Daniel Hoan, former Mayor of Milwaukee and Democratic candidate for Governor in 1944
Stanley Z. Fajkowski, former tavern keeper and unsuccessful candidate for Democratic nomination for Governor in 1942

Results

Republican primary

Candidates
Ralph F. Amoth, unsuccessful candidate for Progressive nomination for Governor in 1944
Walter Samuel Goodland, incumbent Governor
Ralph M. Immell, former Wisconsin Adjutant General
Delbert J. Kenny, businessman and unsuccessful candidate for Republican nomination for Governor in 1944
Otto R. Werkmeister, unsuccessful candidate for Republican nomination for Lieutenant Governor in 1944

Results

General election

Candidates
Major party candidates
Walter Samuel Goodland, Democratic
Daniel Hoan, Republican

Other candidates
Sigmund Eisenscher, Communist
Jerry Kenyon, Socialist Labor
Walter H. Uphoff, Socialist, candidate for U.S. Senate in 1944

Results

References

Bibliography
 
 

1946
Wisconsin
Gubernatorial
November 1946 events in the United States